The Coordinator for Counterterrorism heads the Bureau of Counterterrorism and Countering Violent Extremism, which coordinates U.S. government efforts to fight terrorism. As the head of the counterterrorism bureau, the coordinator for counterterrorism has the rank of both ambassador-at-large and assistant secretary.

The current acting coordinator is Christopher A. Landberg.

List of coordinators
The role of Coordinator for Combating Terrorism has often rotated throughout a presidential administration, only presidents Gerald Ford and Donald Trump have maintained a single coordinator throughout their term of office.

References

Counterterrorism in the United States
 
United States Department of State